Major Edward Cooper VC (4 May 1896 – 19 August 1985) was an English recipient of the Victoria Cross (VC), the highest and most prestigious award for gallantry in the face of the enemy that can be awarded to British and Commonwealth forces.

Details
Cooper was 21 years old, and a Sergeant in the 12th Battalion, The King's Royal Rifle Corps, British Army during the First World War when the following deed took place on 16 August 1917 at Langemarck, during the Battle of Passchendaele for which he was awarded the VC.

The citation was published in the London Gazette on 14 September 1917, and reads:

Later years
He later achieved the rank of Major.  His medal is on display at Preston Park Museum & Grounds in Stockton. Major Cooper was cremated at Teesside Crematorium.

References

Monuments to Courage (David Harvey, 1999)
The Register of the Victoria Cross (This England, 1997)
VCs of the First World War - Passchendaele 1917 (Stephen Snelling, 1998)

External links
Location of grave and VC medal (Cleveland)
Sergeant Edward Cooper

KRRC Association

1896 births
1985 deaths
People from Stockton-on-Tees
King's Royal Rifle Corps officers
British Army personnel of World War I
British World War I recipients of the Victoria Cross
King's Royal Rifle Corps soldiers
British Army recipients of the Victoria Cross
British Home Guard officers
Military personnel from County Durham